The former Majestic Theatre at 845 South Broadway  in Los Angeles, California was originally built as Asher Hamburger’s Majestic Theatre when it opened in November 1908. It had 1 screen and 1,600 seats. In 1933 it was closed and dismantled.

References

Cinemas and movie theaters in Los Angeles
Theatres completed in 1908
Buildings and structures demolished in 1933
1908 establishments in California
1933 disestablishments in California